Halley is a surname of English origin, meaning: one who lived at, or near the hall in the grove or open place in a wood. The derivation is probably from the Olde English pre 7th century use of Old English heall ‘hall’, ‘large house’ + leah ‘woodland clearing’. following enforced land clearances. At the height of the wool industry in the 14th century, whole villages in Derbyshire, were cleared to make way for sheep pastures. Combined with the later 18th century Highland Clearances it is estimated that there are between seven and ten thousand such villages that have disappeared from British maps. Following the introduction of personal taxation in the 13th century, in England, surnames became required. The earliest recorded use of the surname Halley is held in the village of Beeley, Derbyshire, England, for a witness called Georgii Halley, dated 27 January 1538. The Beeley parish church records show an Anna Halley, who was christened on the 27 December 1577 and an Elizabeth Halley who married John Caleshaw on 13 August 1567.

People with the surname Halley
 Antoine Halley (1593–1675), French poet
 Dave Halley (born 1986), English rugby league player
 Edmond Halley (1656–1742), English Astronomer Royal 	 
 George Halley (1887–1941), Scottish footballer   
 Heather Halley, American actress   
 Henry Hampton Halley (1874–1965), author of Halley's Bible Handbook
 Ijah Halley (born 2001), Canadian soccer player
 Ina Halley (1927–1992), German actress
 Janet Halley (born 1952), American legal scholar
 Patrick F. Halley (1895-1956), merchant and politician in Newfoundland (now part of Canada)
 Paul Halley (born 1952), English musician
 Paul-Louis Halley (1934–2003), French businessman
 Peter Halley (born 1953), American abstract painter 
 Rich Halley (born 1947), American jazz tenor saxophonist and composer
 Robert Halley (1796–1876), English non-conformist minister, educationalist and abolitionist
 Robert Halley (politician) (1935–2021), French politician and businessman
 Rudolph Halley (1913–1956), American politician and attorney   
 Rufus Halley (1944?–2001), Catholic missionary
 Russell Halley (1862–1909), New Zealand cricketer
 Victor Halley (born 1904), nationalist trade unionist in Northern Ireland

Fictional characters
 Sid Halley, fictional detective from Dick Francis's novels

See also
Halley (given name)
Haley (surname), similar but unrelated name
Halley (disambiguation)

References

English-language surnames